This is a list of the Italy national football team results from 1970 to 1989. During this period, Italy achieved first place at the 1982 FIFA World Cup and second place at the 1970 World Cup.

Results

1970

1971

1972

1973

1974

1975

1976

1977

1978

1979

1980

1981

1982

1983

1984

1985

1986

1987

1988

1989

1Indicates new coach

External links
Italy - International Matches 1970-1979 on RSSSF.com
Italy - International Matches 1980-1989 on RSSSF.com

1970s in Italy
1980s in Italy
Italy national football team results